The Samuel Danford Farm is a historic complex of buildings in northeastern Noble County, Ohio, United States.

Samuel Danford first settled at the present farm site in 1817 and quickly built a log cabin.  Here he lived for sixteen years before building the present house; constructed of brick on a stone foundation and topped with a slate roof, it features a simple exterior and a simple interior.  The floor plan has been modified by the construction of a frame addition to the rear, but no obvious changes have been made to the facade.

Mrs. Danford was an active member of the Methodist Episcopal Church, and local Methodists began to meet for worship at the Danford farm as early as 1818.  Known as the Glady Methodist Church, the members decided to construct a church building in 1869 on the Danford property.  By this time, Samuel had been dead for more than twenty-five years, but his widow lived to see the completion of the church building; it was occupied until the church dissolved in 1905.  Located near the church, and also on the original Danford farm, is the church's cemetery: known as the "Glady Cemetery," it is the burial place of Samuel Danford, of his family, and of many other early Noble County pioneers.

In early 1980, the Danford farm property, including the former church and cemetery, was listed on the National Register of Historic Places.  The farm qualified for inclusion on the Register in two separate ways: its architecture was deemed to be historically significant, and it played an important place in the exploration, settlement, and later history of its locality.  Such a designation is unusual: the National Park Service requires that both cemeteries and religious properties pass stricter criteria for inclusion on the Register than other types of historic properties.

References

Houses completed in 1833
Churches completed in 1869
19th-century Methodist church buildings in the United States
Cemeteries on the National Register of Historic Places in Ohio
Farms on the National Register of Historic Places in Ohio
Former churches in Ohio
Houses on the National Register of Historic Places in Ohio
Greek Revival houses in Ohio
Methodist churches in Ohio
Houses in Noble County, Ohio
National Register of Historic Places in Noble County, Ohio
1817 establishments in Ohio